City College is a private college in Hollywood, Florida. It was founded in 1984 as a branch of Draughons Junior College before becoming separate in 1989. In addition to its main campus, City College has additional locations in Gainesville, Hollywood, Miami, and Orlando. The college offers ten associate degrees and three bachelor's degrees and is accredited by the Accrediting Bureau of Health Education Schools.

History
City College was first established in 1984 as a branch of Draughons Junior College. In May 1988, the school added its first branch campus in Gainesville. In Fall of 1989, the school became an independent college and received approval to begin offering its first Associate of Science degrees; it expanded into Bachelor of Science degrees in July 1999.

The second branch of the school, in Miami, began operations in June 1997. In the same year, the Institute of Specialized Training and Management, Inc was approved to offer associate degrees and renamed itself to City College, becoming an Orlando affiliate of the main City College school.
The third branch of the school, in Hollywood FL, began operations in August 2011. The campus offers associate degree programs in emergency medical services, allied health and business.

Academics
City College offers ten Associate of Science degrees in seven major programs, and Bachelor of Science degrees in their Business Administration program. In order to graduate with an associate degree, students must complete 22-28 courses, including 6 general education courses 14 courses in their major area. For bachelor's degrees, students must complete 45-46 courses, including 14 general education courses and 14-22 major courses. Students must also maintain a 2.0 overall GPA, with some major areas having minimum grade requirements for major courses.

Campuses

Originally located on Cypress Creek Road, the main campus of City College was moved to its current location in 2005, after the school purchased the Atrium 2000 office building in 2004 for $11.2 million. The Gainesville campus is housed in a  single-story building near downtown Gainesville with a separate 10,000 sq. ft. classroom location for the veterinary technology lab facilities. The Hollywood campus occupies approximately 16,500 sq. ft. on the second and third floors of 6565 Taft St. Hollywood FL.

All four campuses have special working laboratories to allow students to get hands on experience in their respective fields of study. The school does not offer on-campus housing at any of its locations.

Orlando affiliate
City College Orlando is an affiliate campus of City College. It was originally established in December 1988 as the Institute of Specialized Training & Management, Inc. (ISTM), a school specializing in the education and career development of independent private investigators. In 1989, the school was officially licensed by the State Board of Independent Postsecondary Vocational, Technical, Trade and Business Schools. It began offering vocational programs in 1991, expanding to include associate degrees in 1996. In 1997, the school renamed itself and became an affiliate of City College. The campus obtained accreditation for the Associate of Science degrees it offered in 2000.

As an affiliate, the school has a separate director and board of directors from the other City College campuses, but otherwise has a similar structure and course offerings, the same mission, and similar education guidelines.

Student life
City college does not offer organized student activities and has no sports teams, feeling that their students are attending the school "to learn job skills and many are involved with their own families and organizations". Students are allowed to form their own organizations, with faculty sponsorship and approval of the director. The school currently has four student organizations: Allied Health Student Association, the Broadcast Student Association (only for students at the Fort Lauderdale campus), the City College Ambassadors, and the Private Investigator Student Association.

Accreditation
In 2017, all City College campuses were awarded initial, institutional accreditation by the Accrediting Bureau of Health Education Schools (ABHES).
City College was formerly accredited by the Accrediting Council for Independent Colleges and Schools (ACICS) to award certificates, diplomas, and associate degrees.

References

External links
 

Private universities and colleges in Florida
Educational institutions established in 1984
Colleges accredited by the Accrediting Council for Independent Colleges and Schools
Universities and colleges in Broward County, Florida
Education in Fort Lauderdale, Florida
Buildings and structures in Fort Lauderdale, Florida
1984 establishments in Florida